Labdia ceriocosma is a moth in the family Cosmopterigidae. It was described by Edward Meyrick in 1934. It is found on the Marquesas Islands in French Polynesia.

References

Moths described in 1934
Labdia